Borås Ishall is an indoor arena located in Borås, Sweden. It is Borås HC's current home arena and has a capacity of 3,700 spectators.

References 

Indoor arenas in Sweden
Indoor ice hockey venues in Sweden
Ice hockey venues in Sweden
Sports venues in Borås
1972 establishments in Sweden
Sports venues completed in 1972